Fusibacter is a genus of bacteria within the phylum Bacillota. Species are most well known from technical environments, Fusibacter fontis being the first described species of this genus isolated from a natural environment. The reported members of this genus are fermentative and halotolerant anaerobes. Moreover, these species share sulfur-reducing features capable of generating sulfide starting from elemental sulfur or thiosulfate sources.

The first draft genome of a strain of Fusibacter recovered from a saline environment in Northern Chile has been reported.

References

Peptostreptococcaceae
Bacteria genera
Taxa described in 1999